Yves de Montigny (born July 12, 1955) is a judge serving on the Federal Court of Canada since 2015.

References

1955 births
Living people
Judges of the Federal Court of Canada
People from Montreal